One Tower may refer to:
One Tower (Moscow), a skyscraper under construction in Moscow
One Tower (Balneário Camboriú), a skyscraper residences in Balneário Camboriú
 The One Tower, a 51-floor tower in Dubai